The playoff round of the 2019 IIHF World Championship was held from 23 to 26 May 2019. The top four of each preliminary group qualified for the playoff round.

Qualified teams

The ranking from preliminary round is stated in brackets. This ranking was used for seeding in the semi-finals to ensure that the strongest remaining team faced the lowest ranked team.

Bracket
There was a re-seeding after the quarterfinals.

All times are local (UTC+2).

Quarterfinals

Semifinals

Bronze medal game

Gold medal game

References

External links
Official website

P